The Abyssinian  is a breed of domestic short-haired cat with a distinctive "ticked" tabby coat, in which individual hairs are banded with different colors. They are also known simply as Abys.

The source of the name is not because Ethiopia, formerly Abyssinia, is thought to be the original home of these cats, but because the first "Abyssinians" exhibited in shows in England were reported to have been imported to England from there. Its true origin — according to genetic studies — is likely to have been the coast of the Indian Ocean in parts of Southeast Asia, and its introduction to Abyssinia (and others) was through colonialists and merchants stopping through Calcutta.

Although regarded as comparatively obscure in the past as a breed compared to others, the Abyssinian ranked in 2016 among the top five most popular breeds by The Cat Fancier Association and The International Cat Association.

The breed's distinctive appearance, seeming long, lean and finely colored compared to other cats, has been analogized to that of human fashion models. Personality-wise, the cats traditionally display active, curious attitudes in which they frequently follow owners around and encourage play. Their dog-like characteristics also involve a particular sense of affection and desire for interaction. Abys have a distinctive wildcat look with their ticked coat and large erect ears. They are a highly social breed and can be demanding of attention. They do well in multi-cat households due to their social nature. Not a snuggly lap cat, Abyssinians are in constant motion, either exploring or playing.

History

The earliest known Aby is in an exhibit still residing in the Leiden Zoological Museum in Holland. It was purchased around 1834-1836 from a supplier of small wild cat exhibits and was labeled by the museum founder as "Patrie, domestica India."

Description

Appearance
The Abyssinian is a slender, fine-boned, medium-sized cat. The head is moderately wedge-shaped, with a slight break at the muzzle, and nose and chin ideally forming a straight vertical line when viewed in profile. They have alert, relatively large pointed ears. The eyes are almond-shaped and are gold, green, hazel or copper depending on coat color. The legs tend to be long in proportion to a graceful body, with small oval paws; the tail is likewise long and tapering.

Coat and colors

Abyssinian kittens are born with dark coats that gradually lighten as they mature, usually over several months. The adult coat should not be excessively short, and is ideally fine, dense, close-lying and silky to the touch. The ticked or agouti effect that is the trademark of the breed—genetically a variant of the tabby pattern—should be uniform over the body, although the ridge of the spine and tail, back of the hind legs and the pads of the paws are always noticeably darker. Each hair has a light base with three or four bands of additional color growing darker towards the tip. The base color should be as clear as possible; any extensive intermingling with grey is considered a serious fault. A tendency to white on the chin is common but likewise must be minimal. The typical tabby M-shaped marking is often found on the forehead.

The breed's original color standard is a warm deep reddish-brown base with black ticking, known as "usual" in the United Kingdom, "tawny" in Australia, and "ruddy" elsewhere. Sorrel (also called cinnamon or red), a lighter coppery base with chocolate brown ticking, is a unique mutation of this original pattern. Other variants have been introduced by outcrossing to the Burmese and other shorthaired breeds, notably blue (on a warm beige base) and fawn (on a softer creamy peach base). The less common chocolate and lilac are not recognized in the Cat Fancier's Association (CFA) breed standard but have been granted full champion status in The International Cat Association (TICA) and in the UK. The UK also recognizes the Silver Abyssinian, in which the base coat is a pure silvery white with black (called "usual silver"), blue, cream or sorrel ticking. Various other color combinations are in development, including the "torbie", in which a patched tortoiseshell pattern in any of these colors is visible under the tabby banding.

The breed owes their distinctive coat to a dominant mutant gene known as Ta. The first cat to have its entire genome published was an Abyssinian named Cinnamon.

Temperament

Abyssinians are a popular breed thanks in large part to their unusual intelligence and generally extroverted, playful, willful personalities. They are said to become depressed without constant activity and the attention of their owners. Veterinarian Joan O. Joshua has written that the "dog-like attachment to the owners" of Abyssinian and Burmese cats causes "greater dependence on human contacts". This stands in contrast to the mere "tolerant acceptance of human company" based around "comforts" that multiple other breeds display.

With their interest in playing with their owners combined with their curious intelligence, Abyssinians are known as the "Clowns of the Cat Kingdom". They have an active, outgoing nature, yet tend to be quiet cats. They have soft chirrup-like vocalizations which do not sound like the expected "meow". They are affectionate and friendly toward people.

Health
The breed can be prone to gingivitis, which can lead to more serious periodontitis. Familial renal amyloidosis or AA amyloidosis, a kidney disorder due to a mutation in the AA amyloid protein gene, has been seen in Abyssinians. The Abyssinian has had severe problems with blindness caused by a hereditary retinal degeneration due to mutations in the rdAc gene. However, the prevalence has been reduced from 45% to less than 4% in 2008 in the country of Sweden. With the widespread availability of rdAc mutation detection tests and services, such as those provided by the UC Davis Veterinary Genetics Laboratory, it is possible to reduce the disease frequency in all populations of Abyssinian.

Genetic diversity
The 2008 study "The Ascent of Cat Breeds: Genetic Evaluations of Breeds and Worldwide Random-bred Populations" by Lipinski et al. conducted at UC Davis by the team led by leading feline geneticist Dr Leslie Lyons found that the Abyssinian has a low level of genetic diversity, a heterozygosity value of 0.45 within a range of 0.34–0.69 for all breeds studied, and has genetic markers common to both Southeast Asian and Western breeds indicating that cats from both Asia and Europe were used to create the breed.

Related breed
Somali cats are the same genetic stock as Abyssinians but are recessive for a gene responsible for long-hair.
Ocicats came about from the accidental crossbreeding of Abyssinians and Siamese breeds.

See also

List of cat breeds
Puppy cat

References

External links

 FBRL Breed Page: Abyssinian

Cat breeds
Natural cat breeds